Henrik Bjørnstad (born 7 May 1979) is a Norwegian professional golfer.

Bjørnstad was born in Oslo, Norway. He turned professional in 1997.

Bjørnstad became the first Norwegian on the PGA Tour when he qualified with a tied 13th-place finish at the 2005 PGA Tour Qualifying Tournament. He previously played on the European Tour in 1999 and from 2001 to 2004.

The first season on the PGA Tour resulted in 1 top 10 finish and 17 cuts made in 31 starts. Resulting in ranking at 152nd place on the PGA Tour Money list.

In 2007 to 2009 Bjørnstad played on the U.S.-based Nationwide Tour. In 2009, Bjørnstad secured his playing rights on the PGA Tour for the second time by finishing within the top 25 on the money list. His final position was 18th. However, having again finished outside the top-150 on the PGA Tour money list, he was reported at the end of 2010 as saying he was quitting professional golf.

Bjørnstad resides in Palm Beach Gardens, Florida.

Amateur wins
1996 Norwegian Amateur

Professional wins (1)

Nordic Golf League wins (1)

Playoff record
Nationwide Tour playoff record (0–1)

Team appearances
Amateur
European Boys' Team Championship (representing Norway): 1995, 1996
Jacques Léglise Trophy (representing the Continent of Europe): 1996 (winners)
Eisenhower Trophy (representing Norway): 1996

Professional
World Cup (representing Norway): 2001

See also
2005 PGA Tour Qualifying School graduates
2009 Nationwide Tour graduates

References

External links
Henrik Bjørnstad's own blog at VGB.no  

Profile at golferen.no 

Norwegian male golfers
PGA Tour golfers
European Tour golfers
Korn Ferry Tour graduates
Sportspeople from Oslo
1979 births
Living people